The Battle of the Bulge... The Brave Rifles is a 1965 documentary film produced by Laurence E. Mascott. It was nominated for an Academy Award for Best Documentary Feature. It was later aired on television as an episode of ABC Stage 67.

See also
List of American films of 1965

References

External links

1965 films
1965 documentary films
American black-and-white films
American documentary films
1960s English-language films
Black-and-white documentary films
Documentary films about World War II
The Battle of the Bulge... The Brave Rifles
1960s American films